Churchill station is an Edmonton Light Rail Transit station in Edmonton, Alberta. It serves both the Capital Line and the Metro Line. It is an underground station located beneath Churchill Square and is a part of the Edmonton Pedway system.

An at-grade surface platform is currently under construction above the existing station at Rue Hull (99 Street) and 102 Avenue, and was scheduled to open in 2020; however, as of December 2022 the  Valley Line had not opened and no definite opening date had been announced.

The new platform will facilitate transfers between the Metro and Capital lines below grade, and the Valley Line and Festival Line at the surface level. By 2040 Churchill LRT Station is expected to be one of the major hubs of the Edmonton LRT system, with four out of the five lines currently approved by the City passing through the station.

History
Churchill station opened on April 22, 1978 when the LRT system first began operations.

A tragedy occurred in August 1988 when Cathy Greeve, a 29-year-old mother of two, was found strangled to death in one of the washrooms at the station 

In November 2006, Churchill became the first LRT station in Edmonton to have an exclusive advertisement campaign, with all ad space, as well as many other parts of the station, being used for advertisements for Enmax.

Station layout
The station has a  centre loading platform that can accommodate two five-car LRT trains at the same time, with one train on each side of the platform.  At just under , the platform is narrow by current Edmonton LRT design guidelines.  Access to the platform is from the concourse level by stairs and escalators located at each end of the platform.  The concourse level is part of the Edmonton pedway system.

The LRT system control centre is located on the Churchill Station concourse level. The Edmonton Transit System Customer Services centre, complete with lost and found, was also located in the station before moving to City Hall in February 2013, then to the Edmonton Tower in early 2017. At one time, windows allowed pedestrians to view the control centre, but these were removed in 2008.

Lines

The station serves as a transfer point for the Metro Line, Capital Line, and future Valley Line.

Public art
Churchill station includes two pieces of public art. The first, "Ridden Down" is an abstract sculpture using welded steel that was installed in 1996. The second is a mural entitled "New Year's Eve".

Around the station
Churchill Square
Art Gallery of Alberta
Canada Place
Citadel Theatre
Downtown
Edmonton City Centre
Edmonton City Hall
Francis Winspear Centre for Music
Oxford Tower
Provincial Court of Alberta
Royal Alberta Museum
Shaw Conference Centre
Stanley A. Milner Library
TD Tower
Ukrainian Canadian Archives & Museum of Alberta

References

Capital Line
Edmonton Light Rail Transit stations
Metro Line
Railway stations in Canada opened in 1978
Valley Line (Edmonton)